Australian rules football in Catalonia is run by the Catalan League of Australian Football (LFAC), member of Aussie Rules Europe. Aussie rules was first played in 2002 in the city of Valls. During this time the first club, Belfry Valls, was formed.

There have been several teams playing the Catalan League: Belfry Valls, Cornellà Bocs, Barcelona Stars, Valls Fire, Wendells Salou, Coyotes Alt Camp, Gabas Tarragona, Lleida Coiots and Picamoixons Birds.
In 2009 the Catalan league was played by Belfry Valls, Cornellà Bocs, Andorra Crows and Perpignan Tigers.

LFAC champions and Grand Finals

International Matches 
The Catalonia national team has played three EU Cups in 2005, 2007, and 2008.

2005 EU Cup 
Catalonia was in the first EU Cup in 2005 in London, playing with teams representing Scotland, England, Germany, Sweden, Israel, Netherlands, France, Austria and Belgium. Although other teams had expatriate Australians, all the Catalan players were from Catalonia, finishing in the seventh place.

2007 EU Cup 
The second EU Cup was held in Hamburg, with twelve teams representing Austria, Belgium, Catalonia, Czech Republic, England, Finland, France, Germany, Netherlands, Spain, Sweden and a team called EU Crusaders. Again, Catalonia played with no expatriates, and this time got the eighth place.

2008 EU Cup 
The 2008 EU Cup was played in Prague, and Catalonia competed with England, Finland, Czech Republic, France, Germany, The Netherlands, Scotland, Croatia, Sweden, Austria and the EU Crusaders. At the end, Catalans reached the seventh place.

References 

Cat
Cat
Sport in Catalonia by sport